Domain Lake is a lake in the Unorganized Part of Kenora District in Northwestern Ontario, Canada. It is in the Hudson Bay drainage basin, is within Woodland Caribou Provincial Park, and is the source of Domain Creek.

There are numerous unnamed inflows. The primary outflow, at the southwest and leading towards Hansen Lake, is Domain Creek, which flows via the Rostoul River, the Gammon River, the Bloodvein River, Lake Winnipeg, and the Nelson River to Hudson Bay.

See also
List of lakes in Ontario

References

Lakes of Kenora District